Humber—St. George's was a federal electoral district in Newfoundland and Labrador, Canada, that was represented in the House of Commons of Canada from 1949 to 1968.

This riding was created in 1949 when Newfoundland joined the Canadian Confederation.

It was abolished in 1966 when it was redistributed into Burin—Burgeo and Humber—St. George's—St. Barbe ridings.

It consisted of the Districts of St. George's-Port au Port, Humber, and St. Barbe and all the unorganised territory bounded on the North by the District of Humber, on the East by the District of Grand Falls, on the South by the District of Burgeo and LaPoile, and on the West by the District of St. George's-Port au Port.

Members of Parliament

This riding elected the following Members of Parliament:

Election results

See also 

 List of Canadian federal electoral districts
 Past Canadian electoral districts

External links 
 Riding history for Humber—St. George's (1949–1966) from the Library of Parliament

Former federal electoral districts of Newfoundland and Labrador